Tree Spring is an unincorporated community in Highland Township, Vermillion County, in the U.S. state of Indiana.

History
Tree Spring took its name from a nearby spring noted for a tree within its course.

Geography
Tree Spring is a landmark located at  (40.096430, -87.433110).

References

Unincorporated communities in Vermillion County, Indiana
Unincorporated communities in Indiana
Terre Haute metropolitan area